Nicolas Wain is a British former slalom canoeist who competed from the mid-1970s to the early 1980s.

He won a gold medal in the K-1 team event at the 1981 ICF Canoe Slalom World Championships in Bala.

References
Overview of athlete's results at CanoeSlalom.net

British male canoeists
Possibly living people
Year of birth missing (living people)
Medalists at the ICF Canoe Slalom World Championships